Triplophysa coniptera is a species of stone loach in the genus Triplophysa. It occurs in the Talas River basin, Kyrgyzstan, and the middle Syr Darya basin, Uzbekistan. The latter population may qualify as the subspecies salari.

References

C
Fauna of Kyrgyzstan
Fish of Central Asia
Taxa named by Fedor Alekseevich Turdakov
Fish described in 1954